The Detroit Mercy Titans men's basketball team is the college basketball team that represents University of Detroit Mercy in Detroit, Michigan, and competes in NCAA Division I men's basketball as a member of the Horizon League. Traditionally, the Titans have been a fair  "mid-major" program, advancing to the Sweet Sixteen in 1977 and to the Round of 32 in 1998 and 1999. The Titans are currently coached by Mike Davis, who was hired on June 13, 2018. The Titans play their home games at Calihan Hall on the school's McNichols Campus.

Season by season records
NOTE: The Titans did not field a basketball team in 1907–08 and 1908–09.

Postseason

NCAA tournament results
The Titans have appeared in six NCAA Tournaments. Their combined record is 3–6.

NIT Results
The Titans have appeared in seven National Invitation Tournaments. Their combined record is 5–8.

The Basketball Classic results
The Titans have appeared in The Basketball Classic one time. Their record is 0–1.

Players

Retired numbers 

Detroit Mercy has retired 11 jerseys in program history.

Titans in the NBA
23 Detroit alumni have gone on to play in the NBA. They include:

Paris Bass
Dennis Boyd
Earl Cureton
Dave DeBusschere
Terry Duerod
Bill Ebben
Desmond Ferguson
Willie Green
Spencer Haywood
Jermaine Jackson
Lee Knorek
Joe Kopicki
John Long
Ray McCallum, Jr.
Dorie Murrey
Gino Sovran
Guy Sparrow
Art Stolkey
Norm Swanson
Terry Tyler
Owen Wells
Frank Russell
Terry Thomas

In the late seventies, Coach Dick Vitale led the Titans to two NCAA tournament appearances before heading the Detroit Pistons and later embarking on a broadcasting career that would put him in the Basketball Hall of Fame.

Alumni who played in the NBA G League:
Rashad Phillips
Marc Mazur

References

External links